The Wailers Band are a reggae band formed by Aston Barrett in 1989, one of several spinoffs from Bob Marley and the Wailers.

History
After the death of Bob Marley in 1981, the Wailers continued, led by Aston Barrett and Junior Marvin. The band continued to play a heavy worldwide touring schedule, and recorded as backing band with several singers. Carlton "Carly" Barrett, 36, was murdered at his Jamaica home in 1987. In 1989, Aston Barrett formed the Wailers Band, releasing the album I.D., and continued using the Wailers name when collaborating with other artists. Former Wailer Marvin joined in the early 1990s. The duo, along with a varying lineup recorded under several names, including the "Legendary" Wailers, and simply the Wailers, 

In 2008 Marvin joined another former Wailer, Al Anderson, in The Original Wailers, leaving in 2011.

In 2014, The Wailers Band embarked on worldwide "Legend Tour", marking the 30th anniversary of the release of the best-selling reggae album of all time.

The Wailers Reunited
In 2015, Aston "Familyman" Barrett began the process of reuniting past members of the Wailers, using the name the Wailers Reunited. Shows occurred in South America which included past members such as Barrett, Al Anderson, and Tyrone Downie. The Wailers performed in India for the first time. A US and UK tour took place in 2016.

One World
On August 21, 2020, Barrett's band released the album One World, credited to the Wailers. The album includes the single "One World, One Prayer", co-written and produced by Emilio Estefan, featuring Skip Marley, Farruko, Shaggy, and Cedella Marley.

Band members

The Wailers Reunited (2016)
 Aston "Familyman" Barrett - bass
 Aston Barrett Jr. - drums
 Junior Marvin - lead guitar, vocals
 Donald Kinsey - lead guitar
 Owen "Dreadie" Reid - rhythm guitar
 Josh David Barrett - lead vocals
 Javaughn Bond - keyboards
 Shema McGregor - vocals

The Band in 2020
 Aston "Familyman" Barrett - bass
 Aston Barrett Jr. - drums
 Donald Kinsey - lead guitar
 Owen "Dreadie" Reid - rhythm guitar
 Josh David Barrett - lead vocals
 Andres Lopez - keyboards
 Glen Dacosta - saxophone
 Junior Jazz - guitar

The Band in 2022

At Byron Bay Bluesfest in April 2022:

 Wendel "Junior Jazz" Ferraro - guitar, vocals
 Andres Lopez - keyboards
 Aston Barrett Jr. - drums
 Mitchell Brunings - lead vocals
 Owen "Dreadie" Reid - bass
 Tamara "Teena" Barnes - vocals
 Anne-Marie Thompson - vocals

Discography

Studio albums
 I.D. (1989)
 Majestic Warriors (1991)
 Jah Message (1994)
 One World (2020)

Live albums
 My Friends (Live '95-'97) (1997)
 Live at Maritime Hall (1999)
 Live In Jamaica (2001)
 Live (2003)
 Legend Live (2006)

With other artists
 Reggae Vibration with Joe Yamanaka (1982)
 Reggae Vibration 2 with Joe Yamanaka (1983)
 It's About Time, with John Denver (1983)
 Reggae Vibration 3 with Joe Yamanaka (1984)
 Watchful Eyes Acclaimed LP for Jah Mel (1983)
 "Makisupa Policeman" for Sharin' in the Groove (2001)
 My Beautiful Garden, Donald & Lulu with The Wailers (1982)
 Jerusalem (Alpha Blondy album) (1986)
 Inkarnation, Iya Karna album with the Wailers (1986)
 Real Joy, Ludovic DeBarboza And The Wailers (1987)
 "A Step for Mankind" with Duane Stephenson & Bishop Lamont, Solutions for Dreamers: Season 3 (2010)
 HiFi Calypso'', with Karl Zéro (2004)

Guest singles

Music videos

References

External links
 

1989 establishments in Jamaica
Jamaican reggae musical groups
Musical groups established in 1989